Hello Kolkata is a 2008 Bengali film directed by Manoj Michigan.

Plot
The film explores the relationship of 4 couples. Raima (Swastika Mukherjee), married to Pratik (Amitabha Bhattacharya), has reached a critical phase in her marriage because he, an alcoholic, tortures her with physical and mental violence. Pratik is a BPO manager and much though Raima tries to hold on because of their daughter, her patience has almost reached finishing point. Partha (Sudip Mukherjee), branch manager in an insurance firm, is married to Sheila (Sreelekha Mitra). While Partha places his corporate team under constant stress by reason of his ruthless ambitions, Sheila fails to cope with the reality of her inability to conceive. Anjali (Maitreyee Mitra), a BPO Team Leader working under Pratik, is about to marry Rahul (Indrajeet), an IT professional. Rahul's ambition is to reach the US for better prospects. His sudden decision to switch over to a job in Bangalore pushes the relationship to a crisis, driving the engagement to breaking point. Animesh (Rudranil Ghosh), an insurance executive in a private firm, always fails to reach his sales target. He fails to meet the rising financial demands his wife Geeta (Samapika Debnath) and son Nayan place on him. The family is headed towards a grave disaster until hope makes its presence felt at the end of the dark tunnel.

Cast
 Swastika Mukherjee as Raima
 Amitabh Bhattacharjee as Pratik
 Sreelekha Mitra as Sheila
 Sudip Mukherjee as Partha
 Rudranil Ghosh as Animesh
 Indrajeet Chakraborty as Rahul
 Maitreyee Mitra as Anjali
 Samapika Debnath as Geeta
Zubeen Garg performed the song "Alo Ar Adharer Mugdhota" for this movie.
Amodini Roy as Ashi

References

External links
 
  gomolo.in
https://web.archive.org/web/20090415135125/http://calcuttatube.com/2008/08/25/hello-kolkata-2008/
http://www.upperstall.com/films/2008/hello-kolkata

http://www.screenindia.com/news/Hello-Kolkata--Collage-of-life-in-a-city--Bangla-/353538/

2008 films
2000s Bengali-language films
Bengali-language Indian films
Films set in Kolkata